Henry Percy may refer to:

Baron Percy

Henry de Percy, 1st Baron Percy (1273–1314), took an important part in the Scottish wars of Edward I; knighted, 1296: present at Bannockburn, 1314
Henry de Percy, 2nd Baron Percy of Alnwick (1299–1352), elder son of Sir Henry Percy, 1st Baron Percy
Henry de Percy, 3rd Baron Percy of Alnwick (c. 1321–1368), eldest son of Henry Percy, 2nd baron Percy. Father of Henry Percy, 1st Earl of Northumberland

Earls and Dukes of Northumberland
Henry Percy, 1st Earl of Northumberland (1341–1408), son of Henry, 3rd Baron Percy
Henry Percy, 2nd Earl of Northumberland (1392–1455), son of Henry 'Hotspur' Percy
Henry Percy, 3rd Earl of Northumberland (1421–1461), son of the 2nd Earl of Northumberland
Henry Percy, 4th Earl of Northumberland (c. 1449–1489), son of the 3rd Earl of Northumberland
Henry Percy, 5th Earl of Northumberland (1477–1527), son of the 4th Earl of Northumberland
Henry Percy, 6th Earl of Northumberland (1502–1537), son of the 5th Earl of Northumberland
Henry Percy, 8th Earl of Northumberland (1532–1585), brother of the 7th Earl of Northumberland
Henry Percy, 9th Earl of Northumberland (1564–1632), son of the 8th Earl of Northumberland
Henry Percy, 7th Duke of Northumberland (1846–1918), son of the 6th Duke of Northumberland
Henry Percy, 9th Duke of Northumberland (1912–1940), son of the 8th Duke of Northumberland
Henry Percy, 11th Duke of Northumberland (1953–1995), son of the 10th Duke of Northumberland

Others
Henry Percy (Hotspur) (1364–1403), eldest son of the 1st Earl of Northumberland
Henry Percy, Baron Percy of Alnwick (died 1659), younger brother of 10th Earl of Northumberland and a member of the household of Charles II during his exile
Henry Percy (British Army officer) (1785–1825), aide-de-camp to Sir John Moore and to Wellington, and brought home the Waterloo dispatches
Lord Henry Percy (1817–1877), English recipient of the Victoria Cross
Henry Percy, Earl Percy (1871–1909), son of the 7th Duke of Northumberland, Conservative Government Under-Secretary of State